Ashrin Shariff (born 10 October 1982) is a Singaporean former professional footballer.

Club career 
Ashrin was part of the Singapore Armed Forces Football Club squad which won the S.League title three consecutive years from 2006 to 2008, along with the Singapore Cup in 2007 and 2008.

For the 2009 season, Ashrin has left to Warriors to rejoin former team-mate Masrezwan Masturi at Geylang United.

For 2010, Ashrin will be playing with amateur club Borrussia Zamrud FC in FAS NFL Division 2.

National team career statistics

Goals for senior national team

References

External links 

1982 births
Living people
Singaporean footballers
Singapore international footballers
Warriors FC players
Home United FC players
Young Lions FC players
Hougang United FC players
Geylang International FC players
Singapore Premier League players
Footballers at the 2006 Asian Games
Association football forwards
Asian Games competitors for Singapore